Trichromia is a genus of moths in the family Erebidae erected by Jacob Hübner in 1819. The members of this genus are largely indigenous to South America.

Species

Trichromia albicollis (Hampson, 1905)
Trichromia androconiata (Rothschild, 1909)
Trichromia atta (Schaus, 1920)
Trichromia aurantiipennis (Rothschild, 1909)
Trichromia cardinalis (Dognin, 1899)
Trichromia carinaria (Schaus, 1905)
Trichromia carmen (Schaus, 1905)
Trichromia coccinea (Schaus, 1905)
Trichromia coccineata (Rothschild, 1935)
Trichromia complicata (Schaus, 1905)
Trichromia cotes (Druce, 1896)
Trichromia cucufas (Schaus, 1924)
Trichromia curta (Rothschild, 1917)
Trichromia cybar (Schaus, 1924)
Trichromia cyclopera (Hampson, 1905)
Trichromia declivis (Schaus, 1905)
Trichromia discobola (Hampson, 1905)
Trichromia discophora (Hampson, 1916)
Trichromia drucei (Rothschild, 1909)
Trichromia eximius (Rothschild, 1910)
Trichromia flavibrunnea (Dognin, 1911)
Trichromia flavimargo (Joicey & Talbot, 1916)
Trichromia flavomarginata (Rothschild, 1910)
Trichromia flavoroseus (Walker, 1855)
Trichromia furva (Schaus, 1905)
Trichromia gaudialis (Schaus, 1905)
Trichromia interna (Schaus, 1905)
Trichromia klagesi (Rothschild, 1909)
Trichromia leucoplaga (Hampson, 1905)
Trichromia leucostigma (Sepp, [1855])
Trichromia lophosticta (Schaus, 1911)
Trichromia lucens (Schaus, 1905)
Trichromia macrostidza (Hampson, 1905)
Trichromia maculata (Rothschild, 1909)
Trichromia metachryseis (Hampson, 1905)
Trichromia metaleuca (Dognin, 1911)
Trichromia metaphoenica (Joicey & Talbot, 1917)
Trichromia metapyria (Dognin, 1907)
Trichromia neretina Dyar, 1898
Trichromia occidentalis (Rothschild, 1909)
Trichromia ockendeni (Rothschild, 1909)
Trichromia odorata (Rothschild, 1909)
Trichromia onytes (Cramer, [1777])
Trichromia pandera Schaus, 1896
Trichromia pectinata (Rothschild, 1935)
Trichromia persimilis (Rothschild, 1909)
Trichromia perversa (Rothschild, 1909)
Trichromia phaeocrota (Dognin, 1911)
Trichromia phaeoplaga (Hampson, 1905)
Trichromia postflavida (Toulgoët, 1982)
Trichromia postsuffusa Rothschild, 1922
Trichromia purpurascens (Rothschild, 1909)
Trichromia purpureotincta (Joicey & Talbot, 1918)
Trichromia quadricolor Toulgoët, 1982
Trichromia repanda (Walker, 1855)
Trichromia roseata (Gaede, 1928)
Trichromia samos (Druce, 1896)
Trichromia sanguipuncta (Schaus, 1901)
Trichromia sardanapalus (Rothschild, 1909)
Trichromia sithnides (Druce, 1896)
Trichromia tremula (Schaus, 1905)
Trichromia viola (Dognin, 1909)
Trichromia yahuasae Joicey & Talbot, 1916

Former species
Trichromia apiciplaga (Rothschild, 1909)
Trichromia chrysozona (Schaus, 1905)
Trichromia flavipurpurea (Dognin, 1914)
Trichromia hampsoni (Rothschild, 1909)
Trichromia nigricollum (Dognin, 1892)
Trichromia syntomoides (Rothschild, 1910)

References and notes

  2011: [Contribution to the knowledge of Neotropical Arctiidae VII. Description of a new species of Trichromia Huebner from French Guyana with a curious case of mimicry (Lepidoptera Arctiidae Arctiinae).] Entomologiste, 67'(1): 33–38. [not seen]
 , 1982: Résultats d'un voyage entomologique privé en Guyane Française, 1980, et description de nouvelles espèces d'Arcttides néotropicales (Lepidoptera: Arctiidae). Nouvelle Revue d'Entomologie 12 (2): 165–173.
 , 1991: Le genre Trichromia Hübner 1816, caractéristiques, composition et limites (Lepidoptera: Arctiidae: Arctiinae) . Lambillionea'' 91''' (2): 127–136.

 
Arctiinae of South America
Moth genera